The Sharpshooter Turret was developed by BAE Systems (FMC and later United Defense) in 1980. In  1995–1997 it was updated for production by BAE Systems and FNSS Defence Systems. The turret is a one-man stabilized turret and can be equipped with one of three configurations: dual weapon system incorporating a rapid firing M242 Bushmaster 25 mm cannon, or 40 mm grenade launcher, or 12.7 mm machine gun, along with a coaxially mounted 7.62 mm machine gun. These weapons are mechanically linked to a gunner’s day/night sighting system incorporating a Thermal Imager and Laser Rangefinder.

The turret is fitted with an all-electrical drive system, which incorporates a 2 axis stabilization for Firing on the Move.

The Sharpshooter’s main armament has two primary functions: defeat lightly armored threat vehicles and provide responsive fire support. Fire support not only aids dismounted infantry, but also allows pockets of enemy resistance to be suppressed quickly, permitting the infantry to remain mounted and the momentum of mechanized operations to be sustained. It is also very effective in urban operations where single shot precision firing is required to engage targets in upper floors of buildings.

Users

Sources

External links
FNSS website

Vehicle weapons
Military equipment of Turkey
FNSS Defence Systems products
Military equipment introduced in the 1980s